Miles Glenn Gardner (January 25, 1916 – July 7, 1964) was a Major League Baseball pitcher who played for the St. Louis Cardinals in 1945. The 29-year-old rookie right-hander was a native of Burnsville, North Carolina.

Gardner was one of many ballplayers who only appeared in the Major Leagues during World War II. He played quite well during his time with St. Louis. He made his major league debut in relief on July 21, 1945 against the Brooklyn Dodgers at Sportsman's Park. His first major league win came in his first start, hurling a 7–0 shutout against the Philadelphia Phillies in the second game of a home doubleheader on August 15, 1945.

Gardner's season and career totals for 17 games pitched include a 3–1 record, 4 starts, 2 complete games, 1  shutout, 4 games finished, 1 save, and an ERA of 3.29 in 54.2 innings pitched. Gardner was an all-around talented player, as he hit and fielded extremely well. At the plate, he was 7-for-21 (.333) with a walk, 2 runs batted in, and 1 run scored.  On defense, he handled 10 chances flawlessly for a fielding percentage of 1.000.

Gardner died at the age of 48 in Rochester, New York.

References

External links 
, or Retrosheet

1916 births
1964 deaths
Baseball players from North Carolina
Farnham Pirates players
Gastonia Cardinals players
Houston Buffaloes players
Little Rock Travelers players
Lockport Locks players
Major League Baseball pitchers
Minor league baseball managers
Mobile Shippers players
Nashville Vols players
Navegantes del Magallanes players
American expatriate baseball players in Venezuela
People from Burnsville, North Carolina
Rochester Red Wings players
Shelby Cardinals players
St. Jean Braves players
St. Louis Cardinals players
Tulsa Oilers (baseball) players
Union Springs Springers players